The Gurdjieff movements are a series of sacred dances that were collected or authored by G. I. Gurdjieff .He taught  his students as part of the work of self observation and self study.

Significance 
Gurdjieff taught that the movements were not merely calisthenics, exercises in concentration, and displays of bodily coordination and aesthetic sensibility. Instead, he taught that the movements was embedded real, concrete knowledge, passed from generation to generation of initiates, each posture and gesture representing some cosmic truth that the informed observer could read like a book. Certain of Gurdjieff's followers claim that the Gurdjieff Movements can only be properly transmitted by those who themselves have been initiated in the direct line of Gurdjieff; otherwise, they say, it leads nowhere.

Origins 
The movements are purportedly based upon traditional dances that Gurdjieff studied as he traveled throughout central Asia, India, Tibet, and Africa where he encountered various Indo-European and Sufi orders, Buddhist centers and other sources of traditional culture and learning. However, Gurdjieff insists that the main source, as well as the unique symbol of the Enneagram, was transmitted to him as an initiate in the Sarmoung Monastery. Gurdjieff collected and taught thousands of movements throughout his teaching career. The music for the movements was written by Gurdjieff and Thomas de Hartmann, as well as British composer Edouard Michael.

In Media 
A brief glimpse of the dances appears at the very end of the motion picture about Gurdjieff, Meetings with Remarkable Men, produced and directed in 1978 by Peter Brook.

References

External links
 Gurdjieff Heritage Society resource regarding Gurdjieff Movements and music
Gurdjieff Movements
The Fourth Way Archive
GurdjieffArabic.Org نشرة عربية عن تعاليم جورج إ. غوردجييف
Gurdjieff Movements in Russia
Gurdjieff Movements in Japan & Turkey

Fourth Way
Ritual dances
Sacred dance
George Gurdjieff